The 1981 New York Mets season was the 20th regular season for the Mets. They went 41–62 and finished in fifth place in the National League East. They were managed by Joe Torre. They played home games at Shea Stadium. The season is remembered for a summer strike that cut the season in half.

Offseason
 November 16, 1980: Kevin Mitchell was signed as an amateur free agent by the Mets.
 December 15, 1980: José Moreno and John Pacella were traded by the Mets to the San Diego Padres for Randy Jones.
 December 15, 1980: Rick Sweet was purchased by the Mets from the San Diego Padres.
 December 16, 1980: Rusty Staub was signed as a free agent by the Mets.
 December 19, 1980: Mike Cubbage was signed as a free agent with the New York Mets.
 January 13, 1981: Randy Milligan was drafted by the Mets in the 1st round (3rd pick) of the 1981 Major League Baseball Draft.

Regular season

Season standings

Record vs. opponents

Notable transactions
 April 3, 1981: John Csefalvay (minors) was traded by the Mets to the Houston Astros for Gary Rajsich.
 April 5, 1981: Dan Boitano was purchased by the New York Mets from the Milwaukee Brewers.
 April 6, 1981: Butch Benton was sent to the Chicago Cubs by the New York Mets as part of a conditional deal.
 May 29, 1981: Jeff Reardon and Dan Norman were traded by the Mets to the Montreal Expos for Ellis Valentine.
 June 8, 1981: 1981 Major League Baseball Draft
 John Christensen was drafted by the Mets in the 2nd round.
 Roger Clemens was drafted by the Mets in the 12th round, but did not sign.
 Lenny Dykstra was drafted by the Mets in the 13th round. Player signed July 3, 1981.
 Lou Thornton was drafted by the Mets in the 19th round.
 June 15, 1981: Bill Latham was signed as an amateur free agent by the Mets.
 August 19, 1981: Mike Marshall was signed as a free agent by the Mets.

Roster

Player stats

Batting

Starters by position
Note: Pos = Position; G = Games played; AB = At bats; H = Hits; Avg. = Batting average; HR = Home runs; RBI = Runs batted in

Other batters
Note: G = Games played; AB = At bats; H = Hits; Avg. = Batting average; HR = Home runs; RBI = Runs batted in

Pitching

Starting pitchers
Note: G = Games pitched; IP = Innings pitched; W = Wins; L = Losses; ERA = Earned run average; SO = Strikeouts

Other pitchers
Note: G = Games pitched; IP = Innings pitched; W = Wins; L = Losses; ERA = Earned run average; SO = Strikeouts

Relief pitchers
Note: G = Games pitched; W = Wins; L = Losses; SV = Saves; ERA = Earned run average; SO = Strikeouts

Farm system

LEAGUE CHAMPIONS: Jackson

Notes

References

External links
 1981 New York Mets at Baseball Reference
 1981 New York Mets team page at www.baseball-almanac.com

New York Mets seasons
New York Mets
New York Mets
1980s in Queens